Brecheen is a surname. Notable people with the surname include:

Harry Brecheen (1914–2004), American baseball player
Josh Brecheen (born 1979), American politician